Campania (minor planet designation: 377 Campania) is a large main belt asteroid that was discovered by French astronomer Auguste Charlois on 20 September 1893 in Nice.

Photometric observations of this asteroid made at the Torino Observatory in Italy during 1990–1991 were used to determine a synodic rotation period of 8.507 ± 0.003 hours.

References

External links
 
 

Background asteroids
Campania
Campania
PD-type asteroids (Tholen)
Ch-type asteroids (SMASS)
18930920